The Oklahoma Capitol Improvement Authority (OCIA) is an Oklahoma state agency responsible for issuing bonds to finance the construction of buildings or other facilities for the State of Oklahoma, its departments and agencies.

The Oklahoma Office of Management and Enterprise Services's Capital Asset Management Division is responsible for providing staff support services to the Authority. The Attorney General of Oklahoma provides legal counsel to OCIA and the Oklahoma State Bond Advisor provides advice on the issuance of bonds and other obligations.

Membership
As of June 2013, the Commission has the following members:

External links
Oklahoma Capitol Improvement Authority official website

Capitol Improvement Authority
1959 establishments in Oklahoma